William K. Brown (January 7, 1923 – July 13, 2011) was an American politician. He served as a Democratic member of the Louisiana House of Representatives.

Life and career 
Brown attended Dry Prong High School and Louisiana State University. He served in the United States Navy during World War II.

In 1960, Brown was elected to the Louisiana House of Representatives, succeeding Willard L. Rambo. He served until 1972, when he was succeeded by Richard S. Thompson.

Brown died in July 2011 at the CHRISTUS St. Frances Cabrini Hospital in Alexandria, Louisiana, at the age of 88. He was buried in Forest Lawn Memorial Park.

References 

1923 births
2011 deaths
Democratic Party members of the Louisiana House of Representatives
20th-century American politicians
Burials in Louisiana